Moving Pictures is the seventh album by Holger Czukay, released in 1993 through Mute Records.

Track listing

Personnel 
Musicians
Sheldon Ancel – vocals on "All Night Long", "Dark Moon" and "Rhythms of a Secret Life"
Holger Czukay – French horn, double bass, guitar, synthesizer, production, mixing, recording, vocals on "Radio in an Hourglass" and "Rhythms of a Secret Life"
Romie Singh – vocals on "All Night Long" and "Rhythms of a Secret Life"
U-She – vocals on "Longing for Daydreams", "Dark Moon"
Additional musicians and production
Michael Karoli – guitar on "Rhythms of a Secret Life"
Ursula Kloss – design, illustrations
René Tinner – recording
Jah Wobble – bass guitar on "Rhythms of a Secret Life"
Helmut Zerlett – synthesizer on "Rhythms of a Secret Life"

References 

1993 albums
Holger Czukay albums
Mute Records albums